John Ray (1627–1705) was an English naturalist.

John Ray may also refer to:

John Ray (American football) (1926–2007), American football player and coach
John D. Ray (born 1945), English Egyptologist who deciphered the Carian script
John H. Ray (1886–1975), New York congressman
John J. Ray III (born 1959), American attorney known for overseeing several high profile bankruptcies
John L. Ray (born 1943), Washington, D.C., council member
John Ray (footballer) (born 1968), English footballer
John Ray, Jr., character in the Vladimir Nabokov novel Lolita

See also
John Ray Clemmons (born 1977), American member of the Tennessee House of Representatives
John Ray Webster, American checkers player
Johnny Ray (disambiguation)
John Rae (disambiguation)
Johnnie Ray (1927–1990), singer-songwriter
John Wray (disambiguation)